The North Circular Road (officially the A406 and sometimes known as simply the North Circular) is a  ring road around Central London in England. It runs from Chiswick in the west to Woolwich in the east via suburban North London, connecting various suburbs and other trunk roads in the region. Together with its counterpart, the A205 South Circular Road, it forms a ring road around central London. This ring road does not make a complete circuit of the city, being C-shaped rather than a complete loop as the crossing of the River Thames in the east is made on the Woolwich Ferry.

Design
The road was originally designed to connect local industrial communities together in addition to bypassing London, and was constructed in the 1920s and 1930s. It received significant upgrades after World War II, and was at one point planned to be upgraded to motorway as part of the controversial and ultimately cancelled London Ringways scheme in the late 1960s. In the early 1990s, the road was extended to bypass Barking and meet the A13 north of Woolwich; the sections south from here to the ferry, in Beckton and North Woolwich, are labelled the A1020 and A117 respectively, instead of A406.

The road's design varies from six-lane dual carriageway to urban streets; the latter, although short, cause traffic congestion in London and are regularly featured on local traffic reports, particularly at Bounds Green. The uncertainty of development has caused urban decay and property blight along its route, and led to criticism over its poor pollution record. Several London Borough Councils have set up regeneration projects to improve the environment for communities close to the North Circular.

Route
The North Circular Road forms the northern part of a ring-road around Central London. It has seen substantially more investment than its counterpart, the South Circular Road, and consequently runs on more purpose-built road than urban streets, often coupled with demolition of existing houses and urban infrastructure. Although the route has alternative names at some points, it is generally referred to as the North Circular throughout for route planning purposes. The route is mostly grade-separated dual carriageway from the A40 at Hanger Lane to the A13 in Beckton except for the Drury Way/Brentfield Road junction, the Golders Green Road/Brent Street junction, Henlys Corner and the section from Bounds Green to Green Lanes. In areas where improvements made slowest progress and upgrades are unlikely, the original names such as Gunnersbury Avenue and Bowes Road are used.

Gunnersbury, Hanger Lane and Brent Cross

The road begins in Gunnersbury at the Chiswick flyover (junction 1 of the M4), from which the South Circular Road (A205) heads south over Kew Bridge, and the A4 heads east towards Chiswick and west towards Brentford. The first section runs along Gunnersbury Avenue through Gunnersbury Park to Ealing Common, with a mix of single and dual carriageways, where it becomes Hanger Lane. The road crosses the Great Western Main Line west of Paddington to the Hanger Lane gyratory system, a large roundabout on top of the Western Avenue (the A40) with Hanger Lane tube station. This is one of the busiest junctions in London, used by 10,000 vehicles an hour.

The A406 runs on purpose-built road to the north of the Hanger Lane Gyratory, and is referred to as "North Circular Road" on street signs. The road is a six-lane dual carriageway that connects the industrial estates in the area, and passes beneath the West Coast Main Line near Stonebridge Park. Beyond this, there is a junction with IKEA and the Neasden temple to the south-east, and the road runs alongside open land south of the Welsh Harp Reservoir. Beyond the reservoir, there is a large interchange with the Edgware Road (A5) and junction 1 of the M1 motorway at Staples Corner, and a junction for the Brent Cross Shopping Centre at the Brent Cross Interchange (joining the A41 from Finchley). This section of the North Circular was used for filming the car chasing sequences in Withnail and I.

Northeast of Brent Cross, at Henlys Corner, the North Circular briefly shares carriageways with the A1, which joins it from the left and leaves it to the right to head into Central London. The junction complex also serves the Finchley Road and pedestrian traffic, and consequently is a major bottleneck on the route. Transport for London have invested in the junction, including a special hands-free crossing for the local Jewish community, who can then cross the road on the Sabbath. The road passes north of St Pancras and Islington Cemetery towards Friern Barnet and Muswell Hill. The road narrows to two-lane single carriageway to pass under the East Coast Main Line, and continues as Telford Road towards Bounds Green.

Southgate, Woodford and Beckton

Traffic on the North Circular Road must turn right from Telford Road into Bowes Road, which causes problems with heavy goods vehicles. The road continues past densely packed housing and business areas before widening at Green Lanes and assuming the North Circular Road name again. At Great Cambridge Interchange, its most northerly point, the A406 crosses Great Cambridge Road (A10). The disused Angel Road railway station is partially located beneath the flyover at Angel Road, in an area marked for redevelopment known as Meridian Water. This leads onto the Lea Valley Viaduct that provides a safe crossing of the River Lea's flood plain. The viaduct is part of the original construction and was one of the first of its kind to be built using reinforced concrete.

After the viaduct the road becomes Southend Road, passing north of Walthamstow, and immediately before the Crooked Billet junction, the former site of Walthamstow Stadium. It continues eastward, cutting through a southern section of Epping Forest and meeting the Woodford New Road at Waterworks Corner, before an elevated junction with the M11 motorway and Southend Road heading to Gants Hill. The South Woodford to Barking Relief Road (the section between the M11 and A13) opened in 1987. Previously, the A406 extended along Southend Road and Woodford Avenue as far east as Gants Hill. The current route of the North Circular Road turns south, passing Eastern Avenue (A12) on a flyover at the Redbridge roundabout. It passes Romford Road (the historic Roman Road from London to Colchester) to the west of Ilford and London Road, Barking, and ends at a roundabout with the A13 Newham Way/Alfred's Way in Beckton. To reach the Woolwich Ferry, traffic must follow local roads to the ferry terminal – the A1020 Royal Docks Road, and the A117 named successively as Woolwich Manor Way, Albert Road and Pier Road. The Woolwich Ferry leads across the River Thames, connecting with the eastern end of the South Circular Road on the other side of the river. The junction with the A13 has been built to enable the North Circular to be continued across the junction to the Thames Gateway Bridge if and when it is built.

History

Early history
Proposals for a route avoiding Central London had been in place since the early 20th century due to increasing levels of traffic. In 1910, the London Traffic Division of the Board of Trade had built up schemes for new roads, including what became the North Circular Road, which was designed to skirt the extent of urban development along suburbs.

The North Circular Road was originally designed as an unemployment relief scheme following the First World War. Various manufacturing industries, including furniture production, had moved away from the East End in the early 20th century and started to be based in areas on the fringes of outer London development. As well as a general bypass of Central London, it would connect the communities of Edmonton, Tottenham and Walthamstow, and allow former munitions factories to be reused for industrial purposes. Further west, industrial work increased around Wembley to cater for the 1924 British Empire Exhibition, while former military factories at Willesden, Hendon and Acton would also benefit from being connected by the North Circular Road. The land used for the route was mostly cheap, which encouraged further works and factories to be built by the road.

The original route ran from Chiswick to Southgate, and was open to traffic by the 1930s. Although it mostly ran on newly built road, a section east of Southgate used existing streets. By the end of the decade, the area surrounding the Park Royal estate had become the largest industrial estate in the south of England, and the London Passenger Transport Board was receiving regular complaints about the excess traffic levels.

Due to laxer laws that allowed housing to be built on major roads, as London suburbs developed, residential properties were built on the North Circular Road. The original purpose-built road had been designed with no speed limit, as was typically the case in the 1920s, but by 1951 a 30 mph speed limit was enforced along the route.

In 1946 the North Circular Road became a trunk road, funded from a national budget set by the Ministry of Transport (MOT) rather than a local one.

London Ringways

After reviewing traffic conditions in 1961, the Ministry of Transport planned to increase the capacity of the North Circular Road, grade separating as many junctions as possible, particularly those connecting with important arterial routes. In the 1960s the Greater London Council developed the London Ringways Plan to construct a series of circular and radial motorways throughout London with the hope of easing traffic congestion in the central area. Under this plan the North Circular Road was to be improved to dual-carriageway standard throughout the majority of its length by the late 1970s.

The Ringway projects were extremely unpopular and caused widespread protests, which led to the cancellation of the plans in 1972, particularly after the Westway had opened in the face of large-scale protest two years earlier. In 1974, the MOT scaled back plans to improve the North Circular Road, though by the end of the decade they had revised plans to improve the route to dual carriageway throughout without any property frontages. In 1979, the Ministry of Transport planned to improve the Great Cambridge Road Roundabout with a £17 million scheme that would have demolished over 100 houses and shops. This was cancelled and replaced with a straightforward underpass in 1983, costing £22.3 million.

South Woodford to Barking Relief Road
The section of the North Circular south of Charlie Brown's Roundabout in South Woodford is the "South Woodford to Barking Relief Road". Prior to its opening, the signposted North Circular route from the Waterworks Roundabout to the Woolwich Ferry was on local roads via Whipps Cross, Wanstead, Manor Park and Beckton. As well as delays for the ferry, traffic could also be held due to closure of bridges in the Royal Albert and King George V Docks. The road was originally planned to be a continuation of the M11, but the standard of road was decreased to a basic dual carriageway. It was proposed to be built in the 1980s concurrently with the controversial M11 link road.

Henlys Corner and Bounds Green improvements

The North Circular Road ceased to be a trunk road in 2000, when control of all roads inside Greater London passed to Transport for London (TfL). In 2004, Mayor of London Ken Livingstone promised limited improvements to the road, but received criticism for not approving earlier plans for widening the often heavily congested road at critical sections. In 2009, it was announced that major works between the Bounds Green Road and Green Lanes junctions would finally go ahead, having been proposed for over 90 years, and was completed the following year. The work improved the carriageway between these junctions, widening Telford Road to two lanes and improving all of the junctions along the route. Improvements were also made to walkways and cycle paths along this route. However, unlike elsewhere on the North Circular, the new junctions are not grade-separated and have been designed with environmental concerns in mind. The opened scheme is a reduced specification from 1960s plans, which projected this section of the North Circular to be dual carriageway.

In April 2011, after many years of proposals and delays, construction began on a major upgrade of the Henlys Corner interchange. An underpass was originally proposed but this was heavily criticised by local residents, and would have been very costly, and it was subsequently scrapped. The upgrade scheme improved on the current junction by adding extra lanes and allowing easier left and right turns, speeding up queue times. Cycle paths and safer pedestrian crossings were included.

In July 2013, a task force set up by the Mayor of London Boris Johnson proposed that long sections of the North Circular (as well as the South Circular) should be put underground in road tunnels, freeing up space on the surface to provide public space, extensive cycle routes, and better links to existing communities currently severed by the road. Caroline Pidgeon, deputy chair of the London Assembly's Transport Committee, responded, "It doesn't make sense and it won't add up – [there's a] £30bn estimate, but I'm sure it'll cost at least double that, and the reality is we'll lose homes around these roads and so on."

Environment and safety

The North Circular Road has received regular criticism over its poor safety record and piecemeal improvement schemes due to a lack of funding since it opened to traffic. In 1989, Michael Portillo, then a Member of Parliament for Enfield Southgate, complained that 367 houses were scheduled for demolition as part of improvements to the North Circular in his constituency. Friends of the Earth have complained about rising costs and delays to junction and safety improvements. In 2003, environment cabinet member Terry Neville said that TfL's proposed improvements for improving the North Circular were "a sham" and that the local council wanted a six-lane motorway to properly solve congestion.

The uncertainty over the future of the North Circular Road has blighted properties on and near it, particularly around Bounds Green. Around 1972, approximately 400 homes on the road were compulsorily purchased by the Greater London Council in conjunction with widening schemes that were then cancelled. The properties have suffered from a lack of long-term care. Since TfL took responsibility for the road, land for future schemes has been left dormant, resulting in urban decay with derelict properties. Compulsorily purchased properties were let out to various short-term tenants, which led to them housing prostitutes and migrant workers living in increasing squalor. Pedestrians have become too frightened to use underpasses along the road, particularly to access North Middlesex Hospital. Areas close to the road, such as the alleys behind properties on the Telford Road section, have suffered from fly tipping and anti-social behaviour.

In 2011, Enfield Borough Council proposed a North Circular Area Action Plan, which would regenerate the area immediately around Telford Road and Bowes Road, and encourage growth. This includes new pedestrian crossings and improved access to existing open spaces, including Arnos Park and Broomfield Park.

In 2002, the North Circular was rated as Britain's noisiest road by the UK Noise Association. In 2013, the road was named in a BBC report as being the most polluted in London, including the highest surveyed levels of benzene and nitrogen dioxide. A report in the Sunday Times, referring to the North Circular, said "if you want to pull back the lid of your convertible and drink in the fresh air, look elsewhere". In 2019, a BBC News report said that the section between Chiswick and Hanger Lane was the most congested in Britain.

Junctions
The North Circular Road has a wide variety of styles and standards of junctions connecting to other roads. These range from the complex, grade-separated design at Charlie Brown's near Woodford, to at-grade junctions with traffic lights. The original road contained entirely at-grade junctions; many of these were improved and grade separated during the late 1970s and early 1980s.

Current junctions

Former junctions

Public transport
There are three bus routes that largely serve their routes on the North Circular Road:
London Buses route 34: between Bounds Green and Walthamstow/South Chingford (Crooked Billet)
London Buses route 112: between Ealing (Hanger Lane) and Finchley (Henlys Corner)
London Buses route 232: in Brent Park/Neasden and between Staples Corner/Brent Cross and Palmers Green (Green Lanes)

Cultural references
The North Circular Road is mentioned in the poet Louis MacNeice's 1938 piece, Autumn Journal. In it, he describes the features along the road, including factories, prefabricated buildings, bungalows and petrol pumps "like intransigent gangs of idols". Keith Moon played his first gig with The Who at a pub on the North Circular Road on 2 May 1964.

The original Ace Cafe was on the North Circular Road. Open 24 hours a day, it catered for late-night party-goers and boy racers. It was a popular place for cars to be hot-wired and stolen, as drivers knew they could make a quick getaway. IWG founder Mark Dixon's first business on returning to Britain after an extended time abroad was a hot-dog stand on the North Circular Road, making his own buns. He grew the business into a full-time bakery which he sold in 1989 for £800,000 (now £).

References
Citations

Sources

External links

A406 and Ringway 2 – North Circular on CBRD
 A406 traffic updates on londontraffic.org

 

Ring roads in London
Roads in London
Transport in the London Borough of Barking and Dagenham
Streets in the London Borough of Barnet
Streets in the London Borough of Brent
Streets in the London Borough of Ealing
Streets in the London Borough of Enfield
Streets in the London Borough of Hounslow
Streets in the London Borough of Newham
Transport in the London Borough of Redbridge
Streets in the London Borough of Waltham Forest